Dad Man Cat was the first LP by Corduroy to be released by Acid Jazz Records, in 1992. It is primarily an instrumental album, with what became the classic Corduroy sound. The album was reissued on vinyl by Acid Jazz Records in 2018.

Reception
AllMusic awarded the album with three stars and its review by Jason Ankeny describes the album as: "The lounge-kitsch debut from Corduroy spotlights the group's blend of jazz and funk sounds". In his review for Louder Than War, Matt Mead states: "Dad Man Cat takes a stab at 1960’s Michael Caine, Alfie and Blowup  with its revved up organ groves, silky bass smooth lines, fast moving guitar riffs and drums that sound, at times, to being played at 10,000 mph".

Track listing
 "Chowdown" (Ben Addison, Nelson-Smith, Richard Searle) – 4:25
 "Long Cool & Bubbly" (Corduroy) – 4:23
 "The Girl Who Was Death" (Addison, Scott Addison, Nelson-Smith, Searle) – 4:44
 "How To Steal The World" (Corduroy) – 4:02
 "Frug In G Major" (Addison, Nelson-Smith, Searle) – 4:43
 "Electric Soup" (Corduroy) – 5:00
 "Ponytail" (Corduroy) – 4:58
 "Harry Palmer" (Addison, Addison, Nelson-Smith, Searle) – 4:08
 "E-Type" (Addison) – 4:29
 "Skirt Alert" (Corduroy) – 3:31
 "Six Plus One" (Addison, Addison, Nelson-Smith, Searle) – 3:02
 "Money Is" (Quincy Jones) – 4:37

Personnel 
Scott Addison – vocals, keyboards
Ben Addison – drums
Simon Nelson-Smith – guitar
Richard Searle – bass guitar
Robin Lurie - percussion
Corduroy – producer
John Laker – engineer
Eddie Piller – producer

References

External links
Corduroy - www.acidjazz.co.uk

1993 debut albums
Corduroy (band) albums
Acid Jazz Records albums